The 1881 Yale Bulldogs football team represented Yale University in the 1881 college football season. The team compiled a 5–0–1 record, did not allow opposing teams to score a single point, outscored all opponents, 10-0, and was retroactively named co-national champions by the National Championship Foundation and Parke H. Davis.

Schedule

Roster
 Rushers: Howard H. Knapp, Arthur L. Farwell, Ray Tompkins, Louis K. Hull, Charles Bigelow Storrs, Franklin M. Eaton, Charles S. Beck
 Quarterback: Walter Irving Badger
 Halfbacks: Eugene Lamb Richards, Walter Camp
 Back: Benjamin Wisner Bacon
Source:

References

Yale
Yale Bulldogs football seasons
College football national champions
College football undefeated seasons
Yale Bulldogs football